Orealla (or Orealla Mission) is an Indigenous community in the East Berbice-Corentyne Region of Guyana, on the Courantyne River, approximately  south of Crabwood Creek and  north of Epira, located at , altitude 11 metres.  south-east on the other side of the Courantyne River lies the Surinamese village of Apoera. Orealla is an indigenous village.

The village can only be reached by boat or plane. The population is mainly active in subsistence agriculture and logging.

Orealla has a contract with the Barama Company, a logging company.

Small ocean-going vessels are able to navigate the Courantyne River for about 70 km, to the first rapids at Orealla.

Cultural references 
Guyanese novelist Roy Heath wrote a 1984 novel entitled Orealla, featuring a Macusi Indian from the village. Clark Accord wrote the novel Between Apoera and Oreala, which was published in 2005.

References

External links 

Guyana–Suriname border crossings
Indigenous villages in Guyana
Populated places in East Berbice-Corentyne